Georges Ginoux (8 November 1933 – 10 March 2022) was a Belgian-born French politician. A member of the Union for a Popular Movement, he served in the Senate from 2004 to 2005. He died in Presly on 10 March 2022, at the age of 88.

References

1933 births
2022 deaths
20th-century French politicians
21st-century French politicians
French politicians
Union for a Popular Movement politicians
French Senators of the Fifth Republic
Senators of Cher (department)
Politicians from Antwerp
French people of Belgian descent
Mayors of places in Centre-Val de Loire